Mehmet Özyürek (born 17 October 1949) is a Turkish Guinness World Record holder. He has been confirmed as having the world's longest recorded nose. His nose measured 8.8 cm (3.55 inches) when it was last measured on 18 March 2010. It was remeasured in both 2020 and 2021 disproving the myth that a person’s nose and ears continue to grow as you get older. He lives in Artvin, Turkey. Mehmet was bullied by his friends for his nose when younger, but later in life he came to the belief it was a blessing from God. He also claims to have a better sense of smell than the average person and is able to inflate a balloon with his nose.

References

1949 births
Guinness World Records
Living people
People from Artvin